Arnout Kok (born February 28, 1977) is a South African professional stock car racing driver. He currently competes part-time in the ARCA Menards Series, driving the Nos. 01/10 Toyota for Fast Track Racing.

Racing career

Early racing career

K&N Pro Series West 
In 2018, Kok was initially signed to run with Obaika Racing for one race at the 2018 Star Nursery 100. While the team had promised Kok to have a race-ready car before the event, the car did not turn up to the event and eventually, the team withdrew in a press statement. While the team reportedly said that they would try and find Kok another ride to race in the series, he would never run a race in the series.

ARCA Menards Series 
In 2021, Kok was signed to run the 2021 Dawn 150 with Fast Track Racing, finally making his American debut after being delayed due to the COVID-19 pandemic. He would finish well, getting a top 10 in his first ever start. He would attempt three more races that year, with considerably worse results, including a "did not start" at the 2021 Sprecher 150 due to engine issues.

Motorsports career results

ARCA Menards Series 
(key) (Bold – Pole position awarded by qualifying time. Italics – Pole position earned by points standings or practice time. * – Most laps led.)

ARCA Menards Series East

K&N Pro Series West

References

External links 
 

1977 births
Living people
ARCA Menards Series drivers
NASCAR drivers
South African racing drivers